Łukasz Rafał Janoszka (born 18 March 1987 in Bytom) is a Polish professional footballer who plays as a winger or forward for Ruch Chorzów. He is the son of former footballer Marian Janoszka.

References

External links
 

1987 births
Living people
Polish footballers
Poland youth international footballers
Poland under-21 international footballers
Ruch Chorzów players
GKS Katowice players
Zagłębie Lubin players
Stal Mielec players
Ruch Radzionków players
Ekstraklasa players
I liga players
II liga players
III liga players
Sportspeople from Bytom
Association football forwards
Association football wingers